Normanton, Pontefract and Castleford is a constituency in West Yorkshire represented in the House of Commons of the UK Parliament by Yvette Cooper of the Labour Party since its 2010 creation. Cooper has served under the governments of Tony Blair and Gordon Brown alongside her husband Ed Balls, and served as Shadow Home Secretary under the leadership of Ed Miliband. Having served as chair of the Home Affairs Select Committee, she is once again the Shadow Home Secretary.

History
Parliament accepted the Boundary Commission's Fifth Periodic Review of Westminster constituencies which recommended this constituency for the 2010 general election in the district of the city of Wakefield. Due to less increase in population than elsewhere the commission had to reduce constituencies in the county by one, resulting in the "merger" of Normanton and Pontefract/Castleford seats, however some wards of both went to other neighbouring seats to give the correct size electorate.

The commission had great difficulty in naming the constituency, with "Normanton and Pontefract" and "Pontefract and Castleford" both suggested. On 24 May 2006 the modified name was chosen following further public consultation. The only other three-place constituency in England in terms of name is Ruislip, Northwood and Pinner in London.

Boundaries

The constituency first contested at the 2010 general election has electoral wards of the City of Wakefield:
Airedale and Ferry Fryston, Altofts and Whitwood, Castleford Central and Glasshoughton, Knottingley, Normanton, Pontefract North, and Pontefract South.

Constituency profile
The area has the three retail towns, Pontefract being the most touristic — producing liquorice as well as Pontefract cakes — the wider economy includes self-employed trades, work in local manufacturing and jobs in creative industry, retail, public sector and corporate headquarters including in Leeds and Wakefield.

The last working deep coal mine in the United Kingdom, Kellingley Colliery, was a significant employer until it closed in December 2015.

Well recovered from economic decline from the loss of most local mines, the rate of jobseeking benefits claimed is lower than the Yorkshire and Humber average (4.6%) at 4.4% however this slightly exceeds the national average and is over twice that of six constituencies in the region.

Members of Parliament

Election results

Elections in the 2010s

2016 United Kingdom European Union membership referendum 
The results for the referendum were not returned by individual parliamentary constituencies (instead using a counting area within a region), but the Normanton, Pontefract and Castleford area is estimated to have voted by a 69.3% – 30.7% margin to leave the European Union.

Neighbouring constituencies

See also
List of parliamentary constituencies in West Yorkshire

Notes

References

Politics of Wakefield
Parliamentary constituencies in Yorkshire and the Humber
Constituencies of the Parliament of the United Kingdom established in 2010